Frederick Hamilton (born January 1, 1992) is a Canadian former professional ice hockey forward. He played six seasons in the NHL, split between the San Jose Sharks, Colorado Avalanche, Calgary Flames and Arizona Coyotes, and also played internationally for Canada. Hamilton comes from a talented sports family - his younger brother Dougie plays in the NHL for the New Jersey Devils, and their parents, Doug Hamilton and Lynn Hamilton (née Polson), are former Canadian Olympians. Hamilton is currently completing an MBA at Yale University.

Career
Hamilton was born and raised in Toronto, Ontario. He grew up playing for the Toronto Marlboros and attended Crestwood Preparatory College until the 2008 Ontario Hockey League (OHL) draft, when he was selected in the first round by the Niagara IceDogs, with their first ever draft pick.  Hamilton moved to St. Catharines, Ontario, where he played four seasons for the IceDogs - three of which with his brother. During this time, Hamilton graduated from Governor Simcoe Secondary School with a 99% average (the highest average in the Niagara region), won the Ivan Tennant Memorial Award, and attended Brock University part-time. He also played internationally for Canada at the 2012 World Junior Hockey Championships and at the 2010 Under 18 World Championships, and for Ontario at the 2008 World Under 17 Hockey Championships. 

Hamilton was selected by the San Jose Sharks in the fifth round (129th overall) of the 2010 NHL Entry Draft. He played his first NHL game with the Sharks on October 21, 2013. Hamilton scored his first NHL goal on March 19, 2015, for the Colorado Avalanche. Hamilton played parts of three seasons with his brother for the Calgary Flames. On March 26, 2016, the Hamilton brothers became the first brothers in Flames' history to record a point on the same goal.

International play

Hamilton represented Team Ontario at the 2008 World Under 17 Hockey Championships in Port Alberni, British Columbia, where they won the gold medal. He then represented Team Canada at the 2010 IIHF World U18 Championships in Minsk, Belarus.  Hamilton was named one of the three Top Players of the Tournament for the Canadian Team.

Hamilton, along with his brother, were both named to Team Canada at the 2012 World Junior Ice Hockey Championships in Edmonton and Calgary, Alberta. They were the first brothers to play together for Canada at the World Junior Championships since Mike and Randy Moller in 1982. Team Canada won the bronze medal at the event.

Career statistics

Regular season and playoffs

International

Awards and honours

References

External links

1992 births
Living people
Arizona Coyotes players
Calgary Flames players
Canadian ice hockey centres
Colorado Avalanche players
Lake Erie Monsters players
Niagara IceDogs players
San Jose Sharks draft picks
San Jose Sharks players
Ice hockey people from Toronto
Stockton Heat players
Worcester Sharks players